La Quiaca is a small city in the north of the , on the southern bank of the La Quiaca River, opposite the town of Villazón, Bolivia.

It is the head town of the Yaví Department, which includes also the towns of Barrios, Cangrejillos, El Cóndor, Pumahuasi, and Yaví.

La Quiaca is an approximate antipode to Hong Kong.
 
It has all the amenities of a modern city (potable water, electricity, sewer, Internet). This city is one of the north of the Puna which has all the basic facilities for the convenience of tourists, one of the most important urban settlement in northern Argentina.

In the country, this city is the classic reference to the northern end of the country, though in reality this distinction is held by the town of Salvador Mazza, or Pocitos, in the province of Salta. In 1985, after a three-year national tour, the renowned composer León Gieco released a folk album called De Ushuaia a La Quiaca ("From Ushuaia to La Quiaca").

Geography

Climate
During winter months, temperatures during the day are cool, averaging  in July while the nights can get very cold, with temperatures dropping well below . Precipitation is rare during the winter months although snowfalls are possible. During the summer months, temperatures during the day are mild to warm, averaging  although nighttime temperatures can remain cool. Most of the precipitation that La Quiaca receives falls during the summer months. It is possibly the sunniest place in Argentina, averaging 3410 hours of sunshine or 76.9% of possible sunshine ranging from a low of 62.5% in February to a high of 87.5% in July.

See also 

 Humahuaca
 Iruya
 Tilcara
 Purmamarca

References

Notes

 
 Great Circle Airport: SASQ

Populated places in Jujuy Province
Argentina–Bolivia border crossings
Jujuy Province
Argentina
Cities in Argentina